{{Infobox song
| name       = Cups (Pitch Perfects 'When I'm Gone')
| cover      = Anna Kendrick - Cups (Official Single Cover).png
| alt        = A woman is seen with headphones around her neck looking to the corner. Above her, the words Anna Kendrick and Cups (Pitch Perfects "When I'm Gone") are in bold.
| border     = no
| type       = single
| artist     = Anna Kendrick
| EP         = More from Pitch Perfect
| released   = * March 26, 2013 (US single)
 October 28, 2013 (UK single)
| recorded   =
| studio     =
| genre      = Folk pop
| length     = 2:07
| label      = * Republic
 UME
| writer     = 
| producer   = 
| misc       = 
}}
"Cups'''" is a song performed by American actress and singer Anna Kendrick on the 2012 extended play (EP) More from Pitch Perfect. The song rose to prominence following its debut in Pitch Perfect (2012). Republic Records released the  "Pitch Perfect When I'm Gone" remix on March 26, 2013. The original folk song was written in 1931 by A. P. Carter, and in 2009 it was reworked by British musicians Heloise Tunstall-Behrens and Luisa Gerstein recording under the group name Lulu and the Lampshades.

A folk pop song, Kendrick's version uses the children's clapping game known as the cup game for its percussion. The music video was directed by Jason Moore and released on April 12, 2013. In the film, Kendrick appears as a diner worker who imagines everyone drumming their cups along with the tune. It reached number six on the US Billboard Hot 100, giving Kendrick her first top-10 record in the United States. It was also a top 30 hit in Canada, Ireland, the Netherlands and New Zealand.

Background and composition

"Cups" incorporates lyrics from the 1931 song "When I'm Gone" by the Carter Family. Written by A. P. Carter, J. E. Mainer and his Crazy Mountaineers reworked "When I'm Gone" into an Appalachian folk song in 1937 and retitled it to "Miss Me When I'm Gone". British musicians Heloise Tunstall-Behrens and Luisa Gerstein, who performed under the group name Lulu and the Lampshades, reworked the Carter Family's version and introduced the cup game as the song's percussion. Their version of the song was uploaded to YouTube in 2009 with the title "You're Gonna Miss Me". In 2011, Anna Burden covered Lulu and the Lampshades' rendition of "When I'm Gone" and uploaded it to YouTube; her video went viral after it was uploaded to Reddit, leading other musicians to record cover versions using the cup clap technique.

Anna Kendrick discovered the song after watching a video post on Reddit. Kendrick performed the song in the 2012 American musical comedy film Pitch Perfect (2012). The actress told Movieline she was not looking to be in Pitch Perfect and that the musical aspect in the movie's script made her nervous. She ended up being charmed by it later on and decided to stay. The movie's original script called for Kendrick's character Beca Mitchell to perform the nursery rhyme "I'm a Little Teapot" (1939), for a scene in which Mitchell auditions for a college a cappella singing group, the Barden Bellas. When she was asked to demonstrate her singing ability before filming, she performed "Cups"; the film's producers decided to write it into the movie's script in place of "I'm a Little Teapot". In the film, Kendrick uses a plastic cup to play along with the song's rhythm.

The remix features a new bridge section, a folk pop string arrangement, guitar and xylophone, and has been extended by a minute. It was produced by Pitch Perfect director Jason Moore, Julia Michaels, Julianne Jordan, and the Underdogs. Music critics described "Cups" as a folk pop track.

This song is entirely in the key of C Major.
Release and promotion
Kendrick recorded a 76-second cover version titled "Cups (Movie Version)" for the Pitch Perfect soundtrack. Republic Records and Universal Music Enterprises released a remix of her version, titled "Cups (Pitch Perfect 'When I'm Gone')", with new instrumentation for digital download and streaming as More from Pitch Perfects lead single on March 26, 2013,  on mainstream radio. The remix was released as a single in the United Kingdom on October 28, 2013.

Kendrick performed the song on the Late Show with David Letterman, The Tonight Show Starring Jimmy Fallon and Saturday Night Live in 2012, 2014 and 2017, respectively. It was included in the 2015 sequel film Pitch Perfect 2, in which the Barden Bellas perform the song as a ballad. This  version was included on Pitch Perfect 2 soundtrack with the title "Cups (When I'm Gone) [Campfire Version]". A mash-up with George Michael's song "Freedom! '90", titled  "Freedom! '90 x Cups", was released on November 21, 2017. The mash-up's video was released on the same day, and included the Barden Bellas and the top 12 contestants of the 13th season of The Voice. The mash-up was released on the soundtrack Pitch Perfect 3 (Original Motion Picture Soundtrack).

Critical reception
The song was well received by critics. It was described by Heather Phares of AllMusic as "charming", and as "undeniably catchy" by Jeff Benjamin of Fuse. Benjamin praised Kendrick's audition scene, which he thought was an "awesome musical movie moment". Kelly Lawler from USA Today stated Kendrick's rendition in Pitch Perfect is "cute and all" but was really not all that special. However, she commended Kendrick's "spontaneous performance" of the song on the Late Show with David Letterman.Slate Chris Molanphy said the 2013 remix neutered the original version of "Cups" and said he would rather listen to Kendrick's "weird-America ditty" version. Writing for Billboard, Andrew Unterberger praised the original track, describing it as "totally charming", but labeled the remix as "mumfordized" and "needlessly extended", saying it still hits one h—-
of a flat note. Houston Chronicle Joey Guerra lauded the remix, and wrote Kendrick's "plaintive delivery" made it easy to love.

Douglas Wolk of Time magazine placed the song at number nine on his end-of-year list, describing Kendrick's version as a "terrific arrangement." Marcus Jones of Entertainment Weekly put "Cups" at number nine on his The Best Songs From Movies of the 2010s list. Writing for  Screen Rant, Nicholas Howe ranked the song at number one on his Pitch Perfect: Top 10 Covers In The Movie Series list, noting its near-universal popularity.

Commercial performance
"Cups" debuted at number 93 on the January 12, 2013 US Billboard Hot 100 charts . It climbed to number 36 after the remixed version received airplay. The single reached number 10 in its 28th charting week, giving Kendrick her first top-10 chart hit. The song peaked at number six on the August 16, 2013 chart. It was Kendrick's first Hot 100 top-10 entry and one of the shortest songs by length to reach the top 10 during the 2010s. The song spent 44 weeks on the Hot 100. Kendrick is the second artist (after Barbra Streisand) to have a Hot 100 top-10 single and be nominated for both a Tony Award and an Academy Award.

"Cups" performed well on Billboard airplay charts. It debuted at number 40 on the US Mainstream Top 40, a chart focusing on mainstream radio airplay. The track later peaked at number eight. "Cups" peaked at number two on the Adult Top 40 chart. It was a number-one hit on the Adult Contemporary chart, becoming Kendrick's first song to top any Billboard chart. By October 2013, "Cups" had sold 2.5 million downloads in the US. The single was certified triple platinum by the Recording Industry Association of America (RIAA), denoting track-equivalent sales and streams of three million units in the US. It was the 21st-biggest single of 2013.

The single was an international hit, and peaked at number 11 on the Belgium Ultratop Flanders chart, and number 12 on the Canadian Hot 100 and stayed on the chart for 42 weeks. It reached the top 30 in New Zealand, Ireland, and the Netherlands, and reached the top 80 in the UK, and Austria, and was certified platinum by the Australian Recording Industry Association (ARIA) for shipments of over 70,000 copies.

 Music video 
Following the song's popularity, development for the music video began in March 2013, and was directed by Moore and choreographed by Aakomon Jones. The video was released on April 12, 2013, via Kendrick's YouTube channel. During an interview with Entertainment Tonight, Kendrick said that while she wanted to film the music video, she was not keen to make a solo album. She agreed to the music video mostly because she wanted to work with Moore again and because she liked the idea of an entire diner full of people playing the cup song. The actress said she was not playing Beca Mitchell during the video.
 
The clip begins with Kendrick, as a server, standing in a restaurant kitchen cutting biscuits using a cup. She takes the cup and lightly taps it on the table, before starting to tap the cup on the table and clap the song's rhythm. She later walks out into the dining area, where the customers start drumming their cups in various ways on their tables.

The camera follows her collecting dishes and cleaning tables. During the song's bridge section, the camera zooms in and tracks to a wide shot of the staff and customers performing the cup tapping routine. The camera returns to Kendrick, who returns to the kitchen, passing the chef, who is now drumming with a cup. The camera then follows her back to the table where she prepared the biscuits. She drums on the cup and sings again before the timer rings. Kendrick looks back towards the dining area, where the customers are eating and talking normally. She realizes she had imagined the incident and looks at the chef. Kendrick smiles and leaves through the diner's back door, presumably to chase her dreams and never return.
 
John Boone of E! Online praised the video's production, writing that Kendrick "remains amazing and we would not want to challenge anyone from that diner in flip cup". Writing for Entertainment Weekly, Grady Smith described the video as a "beautifully shot clip". The Wall Street Journals Alexandra Cheney lauded Kendrick's performance, writing that she gave a "whole new meaning to flip cup", and described the flip-cup scene as an "epic proportion".

Cover versions
Kendrick's version has been widely covered. In 2013, the South Korean girl group Spica released a cappella versions in English and Korean. In 2014, Miss New York Kira Kazantsev performed Pharrell's 2014 single "Happy" using Kendrick's cup routine during the talent portion of the Miss America Pageant.

The Indian actress Mithila Palkar released a version in March 2016, in which she sang the Marathi song "Hi Chaal Turu Turu" to the track's rhythm. During an October 2016 interview with MTV, the American actor Ben Affleck sang "Cups" for Kendrick. In May 2020, the Pakistani film and television actor Hania Amir covered the song; according to a staff writer of The Express Tribune, Amir played a golden cup, "effortlessly" as a percussion instrument. The writer also called it a "calm and decent version" of the song.

Credits and personnel
Credits adapted from Tidal.

 Anna Kendrick – vocals
 Jason Moore – production
 The Underdogs – production
 Julia Michaels – production
 Julianne Jordan – production
 A. P. Carter – songwriter
 Heloise Tunstall-Behrens – songwriter
 Luisa Gerstein –  songwriter

Charts

 Weekly charts 

 Year-end charts 

 Certifications 

Notes

 References 

External links
 You're Gonna Miss Me (Cups) Lulu and the Lampshades version of "Cups" (YouTube'')

1931 songs
2013 debut singles
Anna Kendrick songs
American folk songs
Republic Records singles
Songs written for films
CONCACAF Gold Cup official songs and anthems